Barbara Sumner (born 1960) is a New Zealand writer and film producer.  Tree of Strangers, her memoir of adoption, loss and discovery, was published by Massey University Press in September 2020.

She co-founded the film production company Cloud South Films with her husband Thomas Burstyn, and has served as a writer for The New Zealand Herald.

Bibliography
This Way of Life (2013)
Tree of Strangers (2020)

Filmography
One Man, One Cow, One Planet (2007, as producer and writer)
This Way of Life (2009, as producer and writer)
Red White Black & Blue (2012, as producer)
This Way of Life (2013)Some Kind of Love (2015, as producer and writer)

AwardsThis Way of Life (2011):
 Shortlist 2011 Academy Awards
 Berlin International Film Festival, Jury Prize.
 Big Sky Documentary Film Festival, Best Feature Film,
 Victoria Independent FF, Texas, Best Documentary
 Bend International FF, Oregon, Best Documentary 2012
 Bend International FF, Oregon, Best Feature Film, 2012
 Iowa Indie Film Festival 2011, People's Choice -
 Iowa Indie Film Festival 2011, Best Documentary
 Docville Official Selection 2011 Belgium
 DocEdge Festival Outstanding Contribution to New Zealand Documentary 2011 Qantas Film Awards 2010, Best Documentary
 FIFO 2011 Special Jury Award
 Anuuruaboro Youth Jury Prize
 Wairoa Maori Film Festival 2010, Audience Award
 Plus Cameraimage nominated Best Cinematography, Poland 2010
 Sold to 22 countriesOne Man, One Cow, One Planet'':
 Best Environmental Conservation Film: CMS Vatravan, India
 Katherine Knight Award: EarthVision International Film Festival
 Best Non-Broadcast Film: Jackson Hole Wildlife Film Festival
 Award of Excellence: The Accolade
 Sold to 16 countries

References

External links
 

Living people
1960 births
People from the Hawke's Bay Region
New Zealand writers
New Zealand women writers
New Zealand film producers
New Zealand women film producers